Mohammadabad-e Darvish (also Romanized as Moḩammadābād-e Darvīsh; also known as Maḩmūdābād-e Darvīsh) is a village in Zeydabad Rural District, in the Central District of Sirjan County, Kerman Province, Iran. At the 2006 census, its population was 13, in 6 families.

References 

Populated places in Sirjan County